Šatrija  is a hill and a hillfort in the Samogitia region of  Lithuania.

Šatrija may also refer to:
, sewing factory in Lithuania
 in Lithuania
, state educational and recreational establishment for children and youth in Vilnius, Lithuania

See also
Šatrijos Ragana, pen name of Marija Pečkauskaitė (1877–1930), Lithuanian writer